Duke Cheng of Lu (鲁成公) was the son of Duke Xuan of Lu (鲁宣公)  and Mu Jiang and the 21st ruler of the state of Lu during the Spring and Autumn period. He held office for 18 years, from 590 BCE to 573 BCE. His name was Heigong 黑肱 (his given name Heigong means "black arm"). 
He was described as a weak ruler under the influence of his mother.

References 

6th-century BC Chinese monarchs
Monarchs of Lu (state)